David J. Cook is the 15th and current president of North Dakota State University (NDSU) located in Fargo, North Dakota.

Life and education 
David J. Cook was born and raised in Ames, Iowa. He is married to his wife, Katie Cook, and they have three children: Ella, Peyton, and Gage.

Cook attended Iowa State University and graduated in 1992 with a Bachelor of Arts in political science and speech communication. In 1995, Cook graduated from the University of Kansas (KU) with his Master of Arts degree in organizational communication and continued on to graduate with his PhD in organizational communication in 1998.

Career

University of Kansas (KU) 
After receiving his PhD, Cook worked as a senior administrator at the University of Kansas Medical Center for 14 years. His titles included: associate vice chancellor of the Institute for Community Engagement, associate director of the Institute of Community and Public Health, executive director of the Midwest Cancer Alliance, assistant vice chancellor for public affairs, and director of health and technology outreach.

In 2013, Cook was named the vice chancellor for the University of Kansas Edwards Campus and dean of the School of Professional Studies. He moved to the main campus of the University of Kansas in Lawrence, Kansas, in 2020 as the vice chancellor of public affairs and economic development. As a senior advisor to chancellor Douglas Girod, Cook oversaw internal and external messaging, outreach, and public relations. He also advised on issues related to communication, public affairs, and economic development

Cook was named an American Council on Education fellow in 2011. He completed his fellowship at the University of North Carolina at Chapel Hill. During his fellowship, Cook studied the School of Public Health.

He is the author of numerous publications and has taught both in the School of Medicine and College of Liberal Arts and Sciences at the University of Kansas.

North Dakota State University (NDSU) 
In January 2022, Cook was named one of five finalists for the position of president at North Dakota State University in Fargo, North Dakota.

The State Board of Higher Education (SBHE) in North Dakota named David J. Cook the 15th president of North Dakota State University on Wednesday, February 23, 2022. He assumed the position on May 17, 2022, succeeding Dean L. Bresciani.

Awards and honors 

 2013, JHAWK Faculty Appreciation Award, University of Kansas Medical Center

References 

Living people
Year of birth missing (living people)
University of Kansas faculty
Presidents of North Dakota State University
University of Kansas alumni
Iowa State University alumni